Joe Allen (born July 19, 1960) is an American author, journalist, historian, and activist. He authored People Wasn't Made to Burn: A True Story of Race, Murder, and Justice in Chicago published by Haymarket Books in 2011. His latest book is The Package King: A Rank and File History of United Parcel Service (2016).

Early life
Allen was born in Stoughton, Massachusetts, the son of Beverly Ann Vigneaux and William Henry Allen. He has three sisters. He graduated from Stoughton High School in 1978.  He entered the University of Massachusetts Boston in the fall of 1978 and took classes through 1983 but did not graduate.

Joe Allen worked for nearly a decade at UPS between its Watertown, Massachusetts and Chicago, Illinois Jefferson Street hubs. Starting out as a part-time loader he worked his way through a series of part-time sorting and driving jobs until his final year at UPS where he was a package car driver in Chicago's Loop.

Allen's work life has largely revolved different sections of the freight and logistics including for such major employers as A.P.A Transport (Canton, Mass.), Yellow Freight (Maspeth, NY), and UPS. He has been a member of several Teamster local unions and a member of Teamsters for a Democratic Union. He campaigned for Ron Carey's reelection in 1996, and for Tom Leedham in the two following Teamster elections.

Born and raised in Stoughton, Massachusetts, Allen has lived in Chicago for two decades. He is the son and nephew of United States Marines. His previous books Vietnam: The (Last) War the U.S. Lost and 'People Wasn't Made to Burn': A Trues Story of Race, Murder, and Justice in Chicago were both published by Haymarket books.

Joe Allen has been a socialist since he read Michael Harrington's The Other America in high school. He studied for several years at U-Mass Boston. Allen has contributed over the years to Socialist Worker (U.S.), the International Socialist Review, Counterpunch, In These Times, and Jacobin.

Books
 2007 Vietnam: The (Last) War the US Lost, foreword by John Pilger.
 2011 People Wasn't Made to Burn
The Package King: A Rank and File History of United Parcel Service (2016)
5sos the unotherized novel

References

External links
 People Wasn't Made to Burn - from Haymarket Books On YouTube.com
 
 Media from Socialism

1960 births
Living people
American civil rights activists
American male journalists
People from Stoughton, Massachusetts
University of Massachusetts Boston alumni
21st-century American historians
21st-century American male writers
Historians from Massachusetts
American male non-fiction writers